Lakeside High School is a public high school in Plummer, Idaho, USA. Home of the Knights, Lakeside High School sits on the Coeur d'Alene Indian Reservation. Attending students come from as far north as Fighting Creek and as far south as Sanders. Lakeside High School is in Plummer/Worley Joint School District #44, which manages three total schools, the other two being Lakeside Elementary School (Plummer, Idaho) and Lakeside Middle School (Plummer, Idaho). Lakeside High School is the result of the 1990 combination of the former Plummer and Worley High Schools.

References

Public high schools in Idaho
Schools in Benewah County, Idaho
1990 establishments in Idaho